The Italian general election of 1968 took place on 19 May 1968.

In Veneto Christian Democracy was, as usual, the largest party with 52.9% of the vote.

Results

Chamber of Deputies
Source: Regional Council of Veneto

Provincial breakdown
Source: Regional Council of Veneto

Senate
Source: Regional Council of Veneto

Elections in Veneto
General, Veneto